is a Japanese sports manga series written by Shinji Morisue and illustrated by Hiroyuki Kikuta. It is about high school gymnast Shun Fujimaki as he pursues his goal of competing in the 2000 Olympic Games, and is in part based on Morisue's experiences as an Olympic champion. The series was published in Shogakukan's  shōnen manga magazine Weekly Shōnen Sunday from June 1994 to October 2000, with its chapters collected into 34 tankōbon volumes.

The series was adapted as a 30-episode anime television series titled Gambalist! Shun, produced by Sunrise and broadcast on Yomiuri TV from July 1996 to March 1997.

In 1998, Ganba! Fly High received the 43rd Shogakukan Manga Award for the shōnen category.

Media

Manga 
Ganba! Fly High is written by Shinji Morisue and illustrated by Hiroyuki Kikuta. Morisue based the series on his own real-life experiences in winning the gold in horizontal bar in the Los Angeles Olympics in 1984 and wanted to inspire more kids to try gymnastics themselves. It was serialized in Shogakukan's Weekly Shōnen Sunday from June 8, 1994, to October 18, 2000. Shogakukan collected its chapters into thirty-four tankōbon volumes, released from December 10, 1994, to December 18, 2000.

Anime 
A 30-episode anime television series adaptation, titled , was produced by Sunrise and broadcast on Yomiuri TV from July 1, 1996, to March 10, 1997.

Reception and legacy 
In 1998, the manga won the 43rd Shogakukan Manga Award for the shōnen category.

The gold-medalist gymnast Kōhei Uchimura has credited the series with helping to inspire him in the sport.

References

Further reading

External links

1994 manga
1996 anime television series debuts
Gymnastics in anime and manga
Shogakukan franchises
Shogakukan manga
Shōnen manga
Sunrise (company)
Yomiuri Telecasting Corporation original programming
Winners of the Shogakukan Manga Award for shōnen manga